Arkul is an urban locality (urban-type settlement) in Nolinsky District of Kirov Oblast, Russia. Population:

References

Notes

Sources

Urban-type settlements in Kirov Oblast